Phytoecia rufiventris is a species of beetle in the family Cerambycidae. It was described by Gautier des Cottes in 1870. It is known from Russia, Japan, Taiwan, Mongolia, North Korea, South Korea, China, and Vietnam. It feeds on Artemisia vulgaris.

Varietas
 Phytoecia rufiventris var. partenigrescens Breuning, 1947
 Phytoecia rufiventris var. atrimembris Pic, 1915
 Phytoecia rufiventris var. tristigma Pic, 1897
 Phytoecia rufiventris var. tonkinea Pic, 1902

References

Phytoecia
Beetles described in 1870